The Revolutionary Communist League can refer to one of several different parties:

Japan Revolutionary Communist League
Revolutionary Communist League (France)
Revolutionary Communist League (Belgium)
Revolutionary Communist League (Austria) Revolutionäre Kommunistische Liga
Revolutionary Communist League (Iceland)
Revolutionary Communist League (India)
Revolutionary Communist League (Israel) Ha-Liga Ha-Komunistit Ha-Mahapchanit (an offshoot of Matzpen)
Revolutionary Communist League (Italy) Lega Comunista Rivoluzionaria
Revolutionary Communist League (Mexico) Liga Communista Revolutionario
Revolutionary Communist League (Palestine)
Revolutionary Communist League (Spain) Liga Comunista Revolucionaria
Socialist Equality Party (Sri Lanka), originally known as the Revolutionary Communist League 
Revolutionary Communist League (UK), a.k.a. The Chartists
Revolutionary Communist League of Britain
Revolutionary Communist League (Internationalist) (USA)

Political party disambiguation pages